The Golden Globe Award for Best Actress – Television Series Drama is a Golden Globe Award presented annually by the Hollywood Foreign Press Association (HFPA). The award honors the best performance by an actress in a drama television series.

It was first awarded at the 19th Golden Globe Awards on March 5, 1962 under the title Best TV Star – Female, encompassing performances in comedy and drama television series, to Pauline Frederick. The nominees for the award announced annually starting in 1963. In 1969, the award was split into the drama and comedy categories, presented under the new title Best TV Actress – Drama and in 1980 under its current title.

Since its inception, the award has been given to 50 actresses. Angela Lansbury has won the most awards in this category, winning four times, and received ten nominations for the awards, the most in the category; all of her wins were for the series Murder, She Wrote, which therefore holds the record for series with the most wins in the category. The record for series with the most different actresses winning the award is held by The Crown, for which three actors each won the award once: Claire Foy, Olivia Colman, and Emma Corrin.

Winners and nominees
Listed below are the winners of the award for each year, as well as the other nominees.

1960s

1970s

1980s

1990s

2000s

2010s

2020s

Superlatives

Multiple wins

Multiple nominations

Firsts
Diahann Carroll became the first actress of African descent to win, when she won at the 26th Golden Globe Awards in 1969.
Linda Cristal became the first actress of Latin American descent to win, when she won at the 27th Golden Globe Awards in 1970. 
Yoko Shimada became the first actress of Asian descent to win, when she won at the 38th Golden Globe Awards in 1981.
Michaela Jaé Rodriguez became the first transgender actress to win, when she won at the 79th Golden Globe Awards in 2022.

See also
TCA Award for Individual Achievement in Drama
Critics' Choice Television Award for Best Actress in a Drama Series
Primetime Emmy Award for Outstanding Lead Actress in a Drama Series
Screen Actors Guild Award for Outstanding Performance by a Female Actor in a Drama Series

References

Golden Globe Awards
 
Television awards for Best Actress